Zhang Xinxin is the name of:

Zhang Xinxin (writer) (born 1953), Chinese writer
Zhang Xinxin (footballer) (born 1983), Chinese association footballer